Amarapur is a village in Belgaum district in the southern state of Karnataka, India. Amarapur is in Bailhongal Taluka, which is sometimes known as Sampgaon Taluka.

References

Villages in Belagavi district